SS Pendleton was a Type T2-SE-A1 tanker built in 1944 in Portland, Oregon, United States, for the War Shipping Administration. She was sold in 1948 to National Bulk Carriers, serving until February 1952 when she broke in two in a storm. The T2 tanker ships were prone to splitting in two in cold weather. The ship's sinking and crew rescue (along with the break-up and rescue of its sister ship ) is the topic of the 2009 book The Finest Hours: The True Story Behind the US Coast Guard's Most Daring Rescue, by Michael J. Tougias.  Tougias' book inspired the 2016 Disney-produced film The Finest Hours with Chris Pine, which focuses on the Pendleton rescue.

Description
The ship was built as yard number 49 by Kaiser Shipyards, Swan Island Yard, Portland, Oregon. Her propulsion was "turbo-electric" (a steam turbine driving a generator that produced electricity to power a motor that drove the propeller shaft). The turbine was manufactured by General Electric of Worcester, Massachusetts.

History
Pendleton was launched on January 21, 1944 and completed in February. She was built for the United States Maritime Commission. She was owned by the War Shipping Administration. Her port of registry was Portland, Oregon. The United States Official Number 245142 and Code Letters KWAA were allocated. During World War II, Pendleton was a member of convoy ON 249, which departed from Liverpool, United Kingdom on August 18, 1944 and arrived at New York on September 2.

Pendleton was transferred to National Bulk Carriers of Wilmington, Delaware in 1948. In July 1951, Pendleton ran aground in the Hudson River, New York. She was refloated the next day. The damaged part of the hull would later play a key role in the sinking.

Loss

On February 18, 1952, while en route from New Orleans to Boston, Pendleton broke in two in a gale south of Cape Cod, Massachusetts. A United States Coast Guard Consolidated PBY Catalina aircraft was diverted from searching for another T2 tanker, to search for Pendleton, and located both sections. At this point, the Coast Guard realized that they were dealing with two ships that had broken in two. The Coast Guard motor lifeboat  captained by Boatswain's Mate, First Class Bernard Webber was dispatched by commanding officer Daniel Webster Cluff from the USCG station at Chatham, Massachusetts.

CG 36500 was pounded by waves going over the sandbar out of the harbor, damaging the boat and leaving it without a compass. The crew pressed on and managed to find the stern section of Pendleton anyway, going on to perform a daring rescue of her crew. Webber carefully maneuvered CG 36500 underneath the listing hull and motored the Coast Guard boat back and forth with the waves while Pendletons crew lowered themselves down the side with a Jacob's ladder. The crew, timing their descent against the rise and fall of the ocean, jumped from the swaying ladder onto the moving deck of CG 36500 while Webber carefully kept his boat under the ladder but clear of the towering metal wall of the broken-up Pendleton.

Nine of Pendletons 41 crew were lost:  eight (including Captain John Fitzgerald) who were on the bow section (which hadn't been part of the rescue), and the ship's cook from the stern section, who had selflessly assisted the rest of the crew off the vessel before himself. He was lost when, as strong gale force winds began to force the ship off a sand bar (where she had temporarily grounded), he jumped from the Jacob's ladder, fell into the ocean, and was struck by Pendleton as it was hit by a wave, killing him instantly. One week later, after its grounding, Pendletons bow was boarded. Of the eight victims stranded on this section, only one frozen body was recovered.

With the survivors on board CG 36500, a disagreement developed over how they should be dealt with. The survivors were safely landed at Chatham.

The rescue of the Pendleton survivors is considered one of the most daring rescues in the history of the United States Coast Guard. All four crew of CG-36500 were awarded the Coast Guard's Gold Lifesaving Medal (rather than just the coxswain, the typical treatment). At the time of her loss, Pendleton was insured for $1,690,000.

The stern ultimately grounded off Monomoy Island, south of Chatham, at coordinates , where it now lies underwater,  and the bow grounded on Pollock Rip Shoal.  The bow section was sold in 1953 to North American Smelting Co. for recycling at Bordentown, New Jersey. However, it was stranded on June 4, 1953 in the Delaware River and dismantled there circa 1978 by the United States Army Corps of Engineers.

References

Further reading
 

Oilers
1944 ships
World War II tankers of the United States
Ships built in Portland, Oregon
Shipwrecks of the Massachusetts coast
Maritime incidents in 1952
World War II merchant ships of the United States
Type T2-SE-A1 tankers